Road 32 is a road in the northwestern part of Iran. It starts from Tehran and it runs from Tehran to Qazvin and Qazvin to Tabriz along Freeway 2 and from Tabriz to Bazargan, on the Turkish border.

References

External links 

 Iran road map on Young Journalists Club

AH1
Roads in Iran
Transport in Tehran
Transportation in Tehran Province
Transportation in Qazvin Province
Transportation in East Azerbaijan Province
Transportation in West Azerbaijan Province
Transportation in Zanjan Province